Military Institute of Technology (MILIT), Pune is a tri-services training institution of the Ministry of Defence of the Republic of India. It trains selected officers of the three services of Indian Armed Forces and officers from friendly foreign countries for command and staff appointments. It conducts the Defence Services Technical Staff Course (DSTSC) for the Indian Army, Indian Airforce and Indian Navy Officers. The institute has a faculty of senior officers from all three services and scientists who provide specialized training on technologies, military warfare, procurement procedures and operational logistics to the student officers. The course trains officers to handle senior commands and staff appointments in the future. On successful completion of the course the officers are awarded with a degree of M.Sc in Military Technology from Pune University. Officers in the service bracket of 9 to 14 years attend this course. Most officers attending this course are of the rank of Major or Lt Col and equivalent.

History 

The forerunner of MILIT was the Institute of Armament Studies established within the campus of College of Military Engineering (CME), Dapodi, Pune in 1952. The Institute then only conducted the Technical Staff Officers' Course for the Army. In the ensuing years, several courses were added to the institute's curriculum based on the needs of the three Services, Defence Research and Development Organisation, DGQA, DAQA and Defence PSUs etc.

In 1967, the institute was renamed as "Institute of Armament Technology" (IAT), which moved into the picturesque location of Girinagar, on the Southern Bank of Khadakwasla Lake; its present location. From the relatively narrow scope of Armament Studies alone in the fifties, the role of the institute was considerably enlarged by the Defence R&D Council in 1964 and further in 1981.

On the basis of accreditation by the All India Council of Technical Education (AICTE), Pune University recognised eight courses for the award of ME degree in 1982. The institute acquired the status of a Deemed University in 1999. It became autonomous w.e.f. 1 April 2006 and was rechristened as Defence Institute of Advanced Technology (DIAT), a Deemed to be University (DU). 

To have an institute completely dedicated to the needs of the three Services, a case was initiated to bifurcate MILIT from DIAT (DU), and the same was achieved on 19 Jan 2012. 
The major milestones leading to final formation of MILIT are given subsequently.

Campus 

The institute is located on Pune-Sinhagad-Panshet road on the Southern Bank of Khadakwasla Lake at Girinagar. There is an all-weather road between NDA and MILIT. 

The campus is spread over 496 acres, divided into Technical Complex and Residential Complex.
 The Technical Complex is spread over 100 acres and houses the Academic Block, Administrative Headquarters, 51 Laboratories, library, etc. of DIAT (DU) and MILIT, Pune.
 Residential Complex is spread over 396 acres and has accommodation for 200 staff and student officers with the ancillaries like Officers' Mess, Officers' Institute, JCOs' Mess, MI Room, Sports Complex, CSD Canteen, Helipad, a market with a bank, Post Office, Gas Agency etc. Kendriya Vidyalaya and MILIT Tiny Tots Primary School are also located in the campus.

Courses 

In order to meet the specific and futuristic training requirements of Armed Forces, DIAT (DU) was bifurcated to form Military Institute of Training (MILIT), Pune.  MILIT is mandated to conduct 23 courses of varying durations from three days to 48 weeks for the Officers of the three services.
 First Technical Staff Course was conducted in 1953–54, later the name of the course was changed to Technical Staff Officer's Course (TSOC)
 TSOC-01 was conducted in Yr 1975–76. 
 On 1 July 2018, TSOC-44 course was redesignated Defence Services Technical Staff Course (DSTSC-01). The  DSTSC-01 is the pioneer course of all Arms and Interservices mid-seniority bracket of Officers whose non-tech and tech phase commenced from 4 June 2018 and 2 July 2018 respectively.

Events 
To commemorate its 10th Raising Day, MILIT conducted a seminar on 'Space Security: National Security Challenges and Strategic Implications' on January 19, 2022. The proceedings were held online due to the pandemic restrictions, and witnessed around 400 online participants. The speakers and delegates included Air Marshal B R Krishna, Chief of Integrated Defence to the Chairman, Chiefs of Staff Committee, Dr V R Lalithambika, Distinguished Scientist and Director, Directorate of Human Space Programme ISRO, Lt Gen Anil K Bhatt (retd), Director General, Indian Space Association, Air Vice Marshal D V Khot, Director General, Defence Space Agency, Major General Dhruv C Katoch (retd), Additional Director at Centre for Land Warfare Studies and Group Captain Ajey Lele (retd), Senior Fellow, Manohar Parrikar Institute for Defence Studies and Analysis.

A delegation of six Sri Lankan Armed Forces officers were on a three-day visit to India as part of the 9th Army to Army Staff talks. As a part of their visit, they visited MILIT on February 11, 2022 to interact with the Commandant and faculty of the institute. The delegation discussed various training methodologies and technical studies undertaken, and they concluded the visit by meeting the Sri Lankan students in the institute. 

On March 1, 2022, Air Marshal Shashiker Choudhary, PVSM, AVSM, VSM, ADC, Air Officer Commanding-in-Chief, Maintenance Command visited MILIT to deliver a talk on 'Fleet Sustenance: Challenges and Opportunities in the Indian Air Force'. They discussed the need for engagement with academia, local industries and start-ups to promote development of home-grown solutions. The importance of self-reliance and 'Atmanirbharta' was highlighted, citing the ongoing geopolitical crisis as a major reasoning.

See also
 Indian National Defence University
 Military Academies in India
 Sainik school

References

https://ids.nic.in/milit.php
 Pune military institute of technology adopts Donje village, Indian Express
 https://timesofindia.indiatimes.com/city/pune/First-batch-of-tech-staff-officers-pass-out-of-Military-Institute-of-Technology/articleshow/13424150.cms
 https://www.robolab.in/clients/military-institute-of-technology-pune/
 https://timesofindia.indiatimes.com/entertainment/events/pune/military-institute-of-technology-at-defexpo-2018/articleshow/63882547.cms
 https://indianexpress.com/article/cities/pune/seminar-on-challenges-of-self-reliance-in-defence-requirements-organised-5175747/
 https://indianexpress.com/article/india/india-news-india/128-officers-pass-out-from-military-institute-of-technology-2802674/
 https://indianexpress.com/article/cities/pune/pune-military-institute-of-technology-adopts-donje-village-5120085/
 https://www.nyoooz.com/news/pune/1072795/pune-military-institute-of-technology-adopts-donje-village/
 https://www.punekarnews.in/valedictory-function-at-milit/
 http://www.punekarnews.in/148-armed-forces-officers-pass-out-from-milit/
 http://www.uniindia.com/~/146-armed-forces-officers-pass-out-from-milit/States/news/1234974.html
http://www.sakaltimes.com/pune/146-armed-forces-officers-pass-out-milit-city-18347
 http://www.dainikprabhat.com/%e0%a4%b8%e0%a4%95%e0%a5%8d%e0%a4%b7%e0%a4%ae-%e0%a4%b8%e0%a5%88%e0%a4%a8%e0%a5%8d%e0%a4%af-%e0%a4%a6%e0%a4%b2%e0%a4%be%e0%a4%b8%e0%a4%be%e0%a4%a0%e0%a5%80-%e0%a4%86%e0%a4%b0%e0%a5%8d%e0%a4%9f/
http://www.sakaltimes.com/pune/milit-organises-workshop-ai-25090
 https://indianexpress.com/article/cities/pune/pune-over-22-officers-from-three-services-take-part-in-the-sixth-chapter-of-capstar-5365619/
 https://timesofindia.indiatimes.com/india/military-officials-deliberate-digitisation-of-terrorism-social-media-misuse/articleshow/65903393.cms
 https://twitter.com/HQ_IDS_India/status/1033041483644002305

https://www.punekarnews.in/milit-handle-bar-cycling-club-to-organise-a-farewell-ride-for-avm-vivek-rajhans-tomorrow/

https://www.punekarnews.in/pune-military-institute-of-technology-celebrates-10th-raising-day/

https://www.mypunepulse.com/milit-celebrates-10th-raising-day/

https://www.punekarnews.in/pune-maj-gen-hari-singh-is-the-new-commandant-of-military-institute-of-technology/

Defence Research and Development Organisation laboratories
Research institutes in Pune
Research and development in India
Colleges affiliated to Savitribai Phule Pune University
Educational institutions established in 1952
1952 establishments in Bombay State